Jablin is a surname. Notable people with the surname include:

David Jablin, American television producer
Lee Jablin (born 1949), American architect